Grushevka is a rural locality (a selo) and the administrative center of Grushevskoye Rural Settlement, Volokonovsky District, Belgorod Oblast, Russia. The population was 574 as of 2010. There are 7 streets.

Geography 
Grushevka is located 21 km southwest of Volokonovka (the district's administrative centre) by road. Krasny Pakhar is the nearest rural locality.

References 

Rural localities in Volokonovsky District